Livingstone Range School Division No. 68 or Livingstone Range School Division is the public school authority for southwest Alberta, Canada.

General
Livingstone Range School Division No. 68 operates 16 schools covering grades ranging from Kindergarten to Grade 12. Enrollment for 2008/2009 was 3,845 students. As well, the school district operates 2 outreach programs and 12 colony schools. The operating budget was $46,022,473 for the 2008-2009 fiscal year.

Schools

Nanton
A.B. Daley School (K-6)
J.T. Foster High School (grades 7-12)

Stavely
Stavely School (K-6)

Claresholm
Claresholm Elementary School (K-4)
West Meadow School (grades 5–7)
Willow Creek Composite High School (grades 8-12)
Outreach North (403-625-3541)

Granum
Granum School (K-9)

Fort Macleod
W.A. Day School (K-5)
F.P. Walshe High School (grades 6-12)

Pincher Creek
Canyon School (K-6)
Matthew Halton High School (grades 7-12)
Napi Outreach School (403-627-4244)

Lundbreck
Livingstone School (K-12)

Crowsnest Pass
Horace Allen Elementary School (K-3)
Isabelle Sellon School (grades 4–6)
Crowsnest Consolidated High School (grades 7-12)

Colony Schools
Clear Lake Colony
Daly Creek Colony (Granum)
Ewelme Colony
Greenwood Colony
Little Bow Colony
Livingstone Colony
Parkland Colony
Pincher Creek Colony
Spring Point Colony
Thompson Colony
Waterton Colony
Willow Creek Colony

References

External links
 Livingstone Range School Division No. 68

School districts in Alberta